A chief gaming officer, or chief game officer (abbreviated as CGO) is an executive position whose holder is focused on research and technical issues within a computer game company.

Responsibilities 
The chief gaming officer or chief game officer is in charge of heading both the game development and the online/offline publishing functions of the company, and unlike most other C-Suite titles, reports directly to the Chief operating officer instead of the Chief executive officer.

The CGO has authority to manage the online game production cycle from start to finish. As head of game development, he or she is solely responsible for the conceptualization and planning of new games, the budget allocations to different gaming projects, the budget allocation within each game, assembling a team of software developers and game designers, and ultimately, the approval of new games.

As head of online publishing, the CGO also manages the online publishing, web portal, localization, and user interaction for all of the company products. The CGO negotiates and executes the appropriate agreements for web hosting and networking services for game delivery to the community, resolving issues with local internet service providers, and making sure that appropriate online payment agreements and systems are in place in each country. In addition to the online publishing of individual games, he acts as the portal manager, coordinating the development and publishing teams for the company web portal, which is of vital importance for a company delivering its products and collecting its user fees exclusively through the Internet.

The CGO has the ultimate decision-making authority over the localization function, being the final person responsible for adapting each game to the geographical market where it is delivered. He interfaces directly with the community manager and marketing manager to ensure that the final product is delivered and marketed in the most effective way, consistently integrating customer feedback into new releases.

Usage 
The first two video game companies that have employed this executive position are Bigpoint and Golden Worlds Entertainment Media Group.

Some Esports teams, including British team Excel Esports, uses the title for their manager.

External links
 Bigpoint Appoints Chief Game Officer, January 18, 2010  
 Golden Worlds Entertainment Media Group appoints former CEO Kalicanthus as Chief Game Officer

References 
Business occupations
Management occupations
Corporate titles
Leadership
Positions of authority
Corporate executives